This is a list of world records progression in men's weightlifting from 1998 to 2018. These records are maintained in each weight class for the snatch lift, clean and jerk lift, and the total for both lifts.

The International Weightlifting Federation restructured its weight classes in 1998, nullifying earlier records and again in 2018.

56 kg

Snatch

Clean & Jerk

Total

62 kg

Snatch

Clean & Jerk

Total

69 kg

Snatch

Clean & Jerk

Total

77 kg

Snatch

Clean & Jerk

Total

85 kg

Snatch

Clean & Jerk

Total

94 kg

Snatch

Clean & Jerk

Total

105 kg

Snatch

Clean & Jerk

Total

+105 kg

Snatch

Clean & Jerk

Total

Notes
  Not a world record at the time of the competition, became a world record when IWF decided to eliminate the world standards from the list of World Records on 24 June 2008.
  Andrei Rybakou's record of 394 kilograms from 15 August 2008 was rescinded on 26 October 2016 following disqualification for banned drug use; which could make Lu Yong the world record holder. By that time, however, it had been surpassed by Kianoush Rostami.
  Rescinded for anti-doping violations.

See also
 World record progression men's weightlifting
 World record progression women's weightlifting
 World record progression women's weightlifting (1998–2018)
 World record progression men's weightlifting (1993–1997)

References

External links
IWF official website
World Record progressions

Men's weightlifting
Olympic weightlifting records